Hit Back (translit. Otvetnyy khod) is a 1981 Soviet action war movie directed by Mikhail Tumanishvili.  It is a sequel to In the Zone of Special Attention.

Plot 
This movie follows the story of a young soviet paratrooper Victor Tarasov - now a captain - who failed to protect the Chief of Staff of his regiment from 'enemy's' ambush while on big-scale 'war-play'; and now - with the help of soviet marines - it is his turn to hit back. And while soldiers play their games - generals play their own ones...

Facts 
It was one of the most attended movies in the Soviet Union in 1981, with an audience of approximately 31.3 million.

References 
Notes

Bibliography
  Peter Rollberg Historical dictionary of Russian and Soviet cinema. Lanham, Md. : Scarecrow Press, 2009 – 793 p. ,  (Page 742)

External links 

Russian action war films
Soviet action war films
1980s action war films
1981 films
Russian sequel films
Films directed by Mikhail Tumanishvili